Miha Vašl (born March 2, 1992 in Celje, Slovenia) is a Slovenian professional basketball player for Hopsi Polzela of the Slovenian Basketball League. He is a 1.92 m tall Shooting guard.

Vašl spent the 2019-20 season with Hopsi Polzela in Slovenia, averaging 10.9 points and 4.3 assists per game. On July 24, 2020, Vašl signed with BC Prievidza of the Extraliga.

References

External links
 Eurobasket.com profile
 Fiba Profile

1992 births
Living people
Slovenian men's basketball players
Shooting guards